Jean Francisque Coignet  (1835 – 18 June 1902) was a French mining engineer and government advisor in Bakumatsu and Meiji period Japan noted for his modernization of the Ikuno Silver Mine at Ikuno, Hyōgo Prefecture, near Kobe.

Biography
Coignet was a graduate of the technical school of Saint-Étienne. During the California Gold Rush he travelled to the United States. In 1867, he was hired by the Shimazu clan of Satsuma Domain to develop the mines and mineral resources of that domain. In 1868, his services were transferred to the control of the Tokugawa shogunate, who requested that he re-develop the Ikuno Silver Mine through the introduction of western tunneling techniques and blasting technology. With the Meiji Restoration, his services were transferred to the new Meiji government, which quickly recognized the need to develop new mines and to upgrade existing mines for greater productivity.

In 1874, he published Note sur la richesse minerale du Japon (Memorandum on the mineral resources of Japan). Coignet departed Japan in January 1877. He died at his hometown Saint-Étienne in 1902.

References
 Cobbing, Andrew. The Satsuma Students in Britain: Japan's Early Search for the essence of the West. Routledge (2000). 
 Tsunashiro, Louis. Japan Mining industry of Japan during the last twenty five years: 1867-1892. Tokyo Tsukiji Type Foundry (1898).

1835 births
1902 deaths
French expatriates in Japan
Foreign advisors to the government in Meiji-period Japan
French mining engineers